Southwestern University (Southwestern or SU) is a private liberal arts college in Georgetown, Texas. Formed in 1873 from a revival of collegiate charters granted in 1840, Southwestern is the oldest college or university in Texas. Southwestern offers 40 bachelor's degrees in the arts, sciences, fine arts, and music as well as interdisciplinary and pre-professional programs. It is accredited by the Southern Association of Colleges and Schools and the National Association of Schools of Music and historically affiliated with the United Methodist Church.

The institution is a member of the Annapolis Group, the Associated Colleges of the South, the Council of Independent Colleges, and is a signatory of the Talloires Declaration.

History

Prior to assuming its current form, charters had been granted by the Texas Legislature (Texas Congress 1836–1845) to establish four educational institutions: Rutersville College of Rutersville, Texas, Wesleyan College of San Augustine, Texas, McKenzie College of Clarksville, Texas, and Soule University of Chappell Hill, Texas.

In 1873, the union of these four institutions opened in Georgetown as Texas University. Intending to reserve that name for a proposed state university in Austin, the University of Texas, the Texas Legislature instead granted a charter in 1875 under the name Southwestern University as a continuation of the charters for Rutersville, Wesleyan, McKenzie, and Soule. The institution considers its founding date to be 1840 when Rutersville College opened. Southwestern thus claims to be the oldest university in Texas and the second oldest coeducational liberal arts college west of the Mississippi.

Southwestern was a charter member of the Southwest Conference in 1915. Southern Methodist University was Southwestern's main rival for several decades in remembrance of an unsuccessful attempt to relocate Southwestern to Dallas which instead resulted in the establishment of SMU. When SMU's student population became much larger, students at Southwestern began considering Trinity University and Austin College to be the school's main rivals. After World War II, Southwestern transformed itself into a small liberal arts institution, discontinuing its post-graduate degrees, disbanding the football team, and rebuilding much of the campus with a massive capital campaign. The endowment rose substantially. 

Until 1965, no African-Americans were allowed to attend the institution. In 1965, Ernest Clark enrolled; he graduated in 1969.

Former president Edward B. Burger stepped down in January 2020 and assumed the role of president and CEO of St. David's Foundation. Southwestern trustee and former provost Dale T. Knobel assumed interim presidency of Southwestern until Laura Skandera Trombley began her term as president on July 1, 2020.

Academics
The institution offers 40 majors and 36 minors divided between the Brown College of Arts, Garey School of Natural Sciences, and the Sarofim School of Fine Arts. In addition to traditional academic majors, Southwestern offers interdisciplinary, independent, and paired majors as well as pre-professional programs in Engineering, Law, Medicine, and Theology. Its most popular majors, based on 2021 graduates, were:
Business/Commerce (53)
Psychology (38)
Speech Communication & Rhetoric (27)
Biology/Biological Sciences (23)
Exercise Science & Kinesiology (20)

In the 2013–2014 academic year, total student enrollment was at 1,536, with a gender distribution of about 60 percent female and 40 percent male. Of the entering first-year students in Fall 2013, 37 percent were in the top 10 percent of their high school graduating class with an average SAT score of 1166 (*writing section not included). While the majority of students come from Texas (89 percent),  the remaining 11 percent come from 23 other states and 6 countries. Minority students constitute 33 percent of the student body.

The student to faculty ratio is 11:1, with an average class size of 15 students. Ninety-nine percent of the tenured or tenure-track faculty hold a doctorate or highest degree in their fields. Collaborative research and publication with students is common.

Research
Southwestern hosts two interdisciplinary academic exhibitions each year to showcase research by students at Southwestern and researchers across the country. The Brown Symposium held in the early spring is an academic conference attracting guest lecturers and panelists. All Brown Symposium speakers present research that shares the symposium's theme for that year. The Creative Works Symposium held near the end of the spring semester offers undergraduate students an opportunity to display their own research as a formal oral presentation, panel discussion, poster presentation, art exhibit, or technology demonstration. These student presentations are often the culmination of senior capstone projects, independent studies, collaborations with a faculty member, or a requirement for receiving research grants.

Speaker series
Southwestern has a history of drawing prolific lecturers to campus, including William Jennings Bryan, Helen Keller, bell hooks, and alumnus J. Frank Dobie. Orators traveling by train often stopped off on their way to or from Austin, giving their lectures and catching the next train. 

Speakers at the annual Brown Symposium have included Isaac Asimov (through a video conference) in the early 1980s and Nobel prize-winning economist Joseph Stiglitz in 2002. Since it began, the Shilling Lecture series has brought a variety of prominent figures, including presidential advisor Karen Hughes (2003), Archbishop Desmond Tutu (2004), former Pakistani Prime Minister Benazir Bhutto (2005), former Governor of New Jersey Thomas Kean (2006), former Secretary of State James Baker (2007), former U.S. senator Bill Bradley (2008), Nobel Peace Prize winner Wangari Maathai (2009), senior fellow in the Bill & Melinda Gates Foundation Global Health Program William Foege (2010), founder of TOMs Shoes Blake Mycoskie (2011), and three-time Pulitzer Prize winner Thomas Friedman (2012).  In 2002, The Writer's Voice series presented Pulitzer Prize winning author Michael Chabon.  The Writer's Voice has also welcomed such authors as Joyce Carol Oates (2000), Margaret Atwood (2003), Amy Tan (2007), and Azar Nafisi (2008).

Awards and rankings

Loren Pope, former education editor for The New York Times, included Southwestern in his 1996 book, Colleges That Change Lives, and in a 2012 update to that book.

Campus
Southwestern University is located in Georgetown, Texas, about 30 miles (50 km) north of Austin. The campus comprises 700 acres (2.8 km²) mostly located north of University Avenue, although the eastern portion of these lands remains largely undeveloped with some portions serving as an EcoLab where faculty and students conduct research. The main campus is organized around a central academic mall formed by a semi-circular grassy area bounded by a pedestrian walkway and academic buildings. Residence halls and on-campus apartments are located to the east and northwest of the academic mall. Sports fields, support facilities, and parking are on the periphery of the main campus.

Notable buildings

The Hugh Roy and Lillie Cullen Building (formerly called the Administration Building) was built in 1898 in the Richardsonian Romanesque style and is listed on the National Register of Historic Places. The Cullen Building currently houses the administration, business office, alumni relations, and classrooms. Throughout various times in its history, it has also housed the campus auditorium, gymnasium, chapel, and library. It is named in honor of Hugh Roy Cullen and his wife.

Mood-Bridwell Hall, originally a men's dormitory, was completed in 1908 and currently houses classrooms, faculty offices, a computer lab, the Debbie Ellis Writing Center, and an indoor atrium. Mood-Bridwell is included in the Cullen Building's listing on the National Register of Historic Places.

The A. Frank Smith Library Center opened in 1939 as the Cody Memorial Library and was built as part of a WPA project. It was expanded in 1966 and again in 1989, receiving the new name as a result of the second expansion. In addition to books and periodicals, the library houses a film and audio collection, 24-hour computer lab, maps, sheet music, and special collections for Texas history and culture, John Tower, J. Frank Dobie, Jessie Daniel Ames, Herman Melville, Aaron Burr, Edward Blake, Thomas Bewick, and Australia.

The Lois Perkins Chapel was built in 1950 and includes an Aeolian-Skinner pipe organ. Stained glass windows along the east and west sides depict Reformation leaders and Methodist leaders with seals for the educational institutions they were affiliated with.

The McCombs Campus Center opened in 1998, replacing the Bishops' Memorial Student Union Building and University Commons. It includes dining facilities, the campus bookstore, ballrooms, and student organization offices. It is named for billionaire entrepreneur and Southwestern alum Red McCombs.

The Fayez Sarofim School of Fine Arts is housed in the Alma Thomas Fine Arts Building, originally built in 1956 on the former property of the Texas rancher John Wesley Snyder, a Southwestern University benefactor. The Fine Arts Building (FAB) has been renovated multiple times, most recently in 1998 and 2008. The FAB houses the 700-seat Alma Thomas Theater, the smaller Jones Theater, the Caldwell-Carvey Foyer, numerous practice rooms, art studios, a black box theater, and an instrumental rehearsal hall.

The Wilhelmina Cullen Admission Center opened in 2009, moving the admissions office out of the Roy and Lillie Cullen Building. It is Southwestern's first "green" building and was designed to receive Gold LEED certification. Some of the building's features include a bamboo floor in the lobby area, skylights in the center of the building, solar-powered sink faucets and reflective roof shingles. Southwestern plans to turn the area in the original Cullen Building formerly occupied by the Admission Office into a museum. The Admissions Center was named after Wilhelmina Cullen, the daughter of Roy and Lillie Cullen.

Student activities and organizations

There are over 90 student organizations on campus. The school hosts chapters of 16 academic honor societies, including a chapter of Phi Beta Kappa, a chapter of Beta Beta Beta (TriBeta), and the founding chapter of the Alpha Chi honor society. The national co-ed service fraternity Alpha Phi Omega also has a chapter. Several groups on campus participate in social activism and awareness on campus and in the Austin area, including College Democrats, Students for Environmental Activism and Knowledge (SEAK), Latinos Unidos, EBONY, and Amnesty International. Religious groups on campus include the national Christian fraternity Kappa Upsilon Chi, Christian sorority Sigma Phi Lambda, Jewish Student Association, Muslims and Allies, and Buddhist Meditation Group. Other groups include Southwestern Breakaway, Mock Trial, Student Health Advisory Council (SHAC), Best Buddies, Cat Partners, Exercise is Medicine, Robotics Club, Business Club, and much more.

Student government
Student government is primarily handled by the Student Congress, with each member elected to represent students living in residence halls, Greek houses, and at-large for students living off-campus. The Student Congress is headed by a president elected through popular vote. An independent organization, Student Foundation, serves as a liaison between students, faculty, alumni, and the administration. A panel of students and faculty maintain the institution's honor code, replacing the Student Judiciary which previously adjudicated violations of the honor code.

Greek life

Southwestern hosts eight national social fraternities and sororities governed by the North-American Interfraternity Council (IFC) and the National Panhellenic Council (NPC). All fraternities occupy houses on the western side of the campus. The sororities do not have dedicated housing, although they maintain chapter rooms in the Lord Caskey Center. Southwestern has a deferred rush allowing incoming students to become familiar with the campus before formal recruitment begins in the early spring. About 1/3 of the student life is involved in Greek life.

IFC Fraternities/NPC Sororities

Southwestern also has the Alpha Tau chapter of Kappa Delta Chi sorority. The Alpha Tau chapter is also a member of Southwestern’s umbrella organization the Coalition for Diversity and Social Justice.

Media
The Megaphone, established in 1907, is the official student newspaper of Southwestern University. Published online and biweekly in print, the newspaper focuses on the campus community, including sections on news, features, opinions/editorials, culture, and sports. Throughout its history, the Megaphone has changed formats several times, alternating between broadsheets and tabloid paper. The newspaper publishes an April Fool's Day edition every spring under the title The Megaphool.

Spyglass Literary Magazine is the student literary magazine. The magazine is the oldest publication on campus, established in 1882 as the Alamo and San Jacinto Monthly and renamed the Southwestern University Monthly in 1895, then the SU Literary Magazine, and finally The Spyglass in 2012. Currently published twice a year at the end of each semester, the magazine features student poetry, short stories, artwork, and photography.

SU Radio is an online radio station broadcasting music and student commentary in hour-long programming blocks.

Athletics

Southwestern is a member of the NCAA Division III Southern Collegiate Athletic Conference (SCAC). Southwestern competes in 20 varsity sports, including football, basketball, cross country, track & field, golf, soccer, swimming & diving, tennis, lacrosse, men's baseball, women's volleyball and women's softball. Intramural sports on campus include handball, rock climbing, and ultimate frisbee. The school mascot is the pirate.

The men's lacrosse team became a varsity sport in 2009 after offering lacrosse as a club sport for 25 years. The men's lacrosse team won the Lonestar Alliance Division II Championship for four consecutive years prior to becoming a varsity sport. The women's team is currently non-varsity and is affiliated with the Texas Women's Lacrosse League, although the university plans to field a varsity team in 2014. The women's team won a division championships in 2007.

In addition to lacrosse, Southwestern has a nationally ranked handball team that won the Division II National Collegiate Championship in 2007. In September 2016, Southwestern's volleyball team moved up to 3rd place in the AVCA coaches poll as well.

Southwestern reinstated football in 2013 after a 62-year hiatus. The institution previously fielded football teams from 1908 to 1951, reaching national prominence during World War II when the institution's participation in the Navy's V-12 College Training Program enlisted talented players from other schools. Southwestern was a founding member of the Southwest Conference and won the Sun Bowl in 1944 and 1945.

Southwestern University Women’s Soccer team won its first-ever SCAC Championship in 2019, defeating Trinity University on penalty kicks.

Notable people

Notable alumni
 Harry Ables – Major League Baseball pitcher
 Jessie Daniel Ames – Civil rights activist
 Mike Anderson- Major League Baseball Pitcher and current Pro Scout with the Texas Rangers
 William H. Atwell – U.S. District Court judge
 Solon Barnett – Offensive tackle and guard for the Chicago Cardinals and Green Bay Packers (1945–1946)
 Hiram Abiff Boaz – Methodist Bishop and former president of SMU
 Joan Bray – State senator in Missouri
 Pete Cawthon – Head football coach and athletic director of the Texas Tech Red Raiders
 Serena DeBeer – Adjunct Professor at Cornell University and Head of Dpt. for Inorganic Spectroscopy at Max Planck Institute for Chemical Energy Conversion
 J. Frank Dobie – Author
 Bill Engvall – Stand-up comedian
 Abbie Graham – Author
 Stanley Hauerwas – Theologian and ethicist
 Jerry Hardin – Actor
 Robert L. Henry – U.S. Congressman from Texas (1897–1917), Chairman of the House Rules Committee
 J. Marvin Jones – U.S. Congressman from Texas (1917–1940), U.S. Court of Claims Chief Judge
 Laura Kuykendall (1883–1935), dean of women at Southwestern from 1918 to 1935
 Hubert Renfro Knickerbocker – Pulitzer Prize-winning journalist and author
 Carlton Massey – Defensive lineman and pro bowler for the Cleveland Browns and Green Bay Packers (1954–1958)
 Earle Bradford Mayfield – U.S. Senator from Texas (1923–1929)
 Margaret (Young) Menzel Florida State University scientist (1924-1987)
 Amanda Sheffield Morris Regents Professor of Psychology at Oklahoma State University
 John Murrell – Canadian playwright and a member of the Order of Canada
 Akshay Nanavati - USMC veteran, author of Fearvana (Class of 2009)
Ernesto Nieto - Founder and President of the National Hispanic Institute
 Jack O'Brien - Co-founder/singer/bassist of The Bright Light Social Hour
 Carl Reynolds – Major League Baseball player and member of Texas Sports Hall of Fame. Played for 5 teams over 12 years
 Jay W. Richards - Philosopher, Theologian, Economist, Apologist, Social Researcher, Author
 Curtis Roush - Co-founder/singer/guitarist of The Bright Light Social Hour 
 Pete Sessions – U.S. Congressman from Texas (2013-2019), Chairman of the House Rules Committee
 Robert Simpson – Meteorologist, former director of the National Hurricane Center, and co-developer of the Saffir-Simpson Hurricane Scale
 William Angie Smith – Methodist Bishop
 Joseph Tyree Sneed, III – U.S. Court of Appeals judge
 Mike Timlin – Major League Baseball pitcher
 R. Ewing Thomason – U.S. Congressman from Texas (1931–1947), Mayor of El Paso
 John Tower – U.S. Senator from Texas (1961–1988)
Annie Clo Watson – social worker based in San Francisco 
 James Marion West Jr. - Texas oil, timber, and ranching tycoon
 Susan Youens - Musicologist
 Claude Porter White - Author and composer

See also
 National Register of Historic Places listings in Williamson County, Texas
 Liberal arts colleges in the United States

References

Further reading
 Jones, Ralph Wood (1973). Southwestern University 1840–1961. Austin: San Felipe Press.
 Jones, William B (2006). To Survive and Excel: The Story of Southwestern University, 1840–2000.

External links

 
 Southwestern University athletics website
 Southwestern University at the Handbook of Texas

 
Private universities and colleges in Texas
Educational institutions established in 1840
Universities and colleges accredited by the Southern Association of Colleges and Schools
Education in Williamson County, Texas
Buildings and structures in Williamson County, Texas
Georgetown, Texas
1840 establishments in the Republic of Texas
Universities and colleges formed by merger in the United States